The 2009-2010 season was the first under the new name Liga de Ascenso, renamed from Primera A.

Also the Clausura part of the tournament was renamed Bicentenario 2010 in honor of the 200 year anniversary of the declaration for Mexican Independence.

Changes 

From Clausura 2009 to the new format there were many changes, the 3 group format was dropped in favor of 1 single table with the top 7 teams advancing to the playoffs, the top team over all to the semifinals and the next 6 teams to the quarterfinals.

The number of teams decreased from 27 to 17 teams

 Querétaro won Promotion to Primera Division de Mexico
 Necaxa finished last in Liga MX and was relegated to Liga de Ascenso
 Real Colima moved to Hermosillo and renamed as Guerreros.
 Salamanca moved to La Piedad and was renamed La Piedad
 Potros Chetumal re-branded to Toros Neza
 Tapatío re-branded to U. de G.

Dropped teams 
 Socio Aguila
 Chihuahua (Indios B)
 Santos Laguna (Santos B)
 Real Colima
 Tigres B
 Atlético Mexiquense
 Tampico Madero
 Monterrey B
 Tapachula (Jaguares B)
 Academicos (Atlas B)

Stadium and locations

Torneo Apertura

The 2009 Liga de Ascenso Apertura was the first and inaugural football tournament of the 2009–10 Liga de Ascenso season. The tournament began on July 31, 2009 and ended on December 13, 2009.

Standings

Position by fixture

Results

Final phase

 If the two teams are tied after both legs, the higher seeded team advances.
 The winner will qualify to the playoff match vs the Clausura 2010 winner

Top-ten goalscorers

2010 Liga de Ascenso Bicentenario Clausura 2010

The 2010 Liga de Ascenso Bicentenario is the second football tournament of the 2009–10 Liga de Ascenso season.

Standings

Position by fixture

Results

Final phase

 If the two teams are tied after both legs, the higher-seeded team advances.
 The winner will qualify to the playoff match vs the Clausura 2010 winner

Awards

Top-ten goalscorers

Relegation table
Relegation is determined by a quotient of the total points earned in the Liga de Ascenso divided by the total number of games played over the past three seasons of the Liga de Ascenso (for clubs that have not been the Liga de Ascenso all three season, the last consecutive seasons of participation are taken into account). The club with the lowest quotient is relegated to the Segunda División Profesional for the next season.

References

External links 
 Official Website
 Unofficial Website
 Official Website
 Unofficial Website

 
2
Ascenso MX seasons